Blue Rhythm is a 1931 American animated short film directed by Burt Gillett, produced by Walt Disney Productions and distributed by Columbia Pictures. It was the 31st short to star Mickey Mouse, the 7th of that year. The plot focuses on a multifaceted performance of W. C. Handy's "St. Louis Blues." The film features the voices of Walt Disney as Mickey and Marcellite Garner as Minnie Mouse.

Plot
The concert opens with Mickey on the piano. His shadow is cast dramatically on the curtain as he plays a classical interlude. Soon he transitions into a ragtime version of "St. Louis Blues." Minnie struts onstage and sings the verse "I hate to see that evening sun go down..." with Mickey accompanying. Soon an unseen band takes over the accompaniment and Mickey joins Minnie; the two mice dance and scat sing two more verses.

As Mickey and Minnie exit stage right, the curtain rises to reveal the band – Pluto on trombone, two goats on violins, a Scottish Terrier on sousaphone, a pig on the cornet, Clarabelle Cow on a double bass, two Dachshunds on saxophones, and Horace Horsecollar on a drum set and xylophone; Mickey reappears through a stage elevator to conduct. After several interruptions, Mickey plays a clarinet and parodies jazz bandleader Ted Lewis; the performance is based in part on the Ted Lewis Band's 1926 recording of "St. Louis Blues".

As the band plays the final notes of the climatic finale, they collectively jump on the bandstand and cause it to collapse. They reemerge from the debris to deliver a final "Yeah!" to the audience.

Voice cast
 Mickey Mouse: Walt Disney
 Minnie Mouse: Marcellite Garner

Reception
Variety (March 8, 1932): "No story to this, but it needs none to get it over. Opens with Mickey at the piano pounding out a number, with Minnie rather spoiling it with the falsetto singing that is considered necessary for cartoon characters. A short dance and then a break to a stage jazz band for the usual trick stuff, but well done and in excellent synchrony. Cartoon work overlaid on a capital musical program."

Releases
1931 – Original theatrical release

Home media
The short was released on December 2, 2002 on Walt Disney Treasures: Mickey Mouse in Black and White.

Television
1998 – Ink & Paint Club, episode #44 "Musical Mickey"

See also
Mickey Mouse (film series)

External links
Blue Rhythm at The Encyclopedia of Animated Disney Shorts
Blue Rhythm at the Big Cartoon Database

Blue Rhythm at the Disney Film Project

References

1931 short films
1931 animated films
1931 films
1930s Disney animated short films
Mickey Mouse short films
Jazz films
Films directed by Burt Gillett
Films produced by Walt Disney
American black-and-white films
Columbia Pictures short films
Columbia Pictures animated short films
1930s American films